This article presents a list of the historical events and publications of literature during the 6th through 9th Centuries.

The list is chronological, and does not include epigraphy or poetry.
For poetry, see: 6th, 7th, 8th and 9th century in poetry. For early epigraphy, see List of languages by first written accounts.

During this period, a number of classical languages inherited from earlier epochs remain in active use (Chinese, Sanskrit, Latin, Greek, Persian, Hebrew).
The same period also sees the rise of newly written vernaculars, partly replacing earlier literary languages (e.g. Old Hindi, Old French, Arabic, Germanic, Celtic, Turkic, etc.).
Literary Chinese in Tang China
Classical Sanskrit in the Middle kingdoms of India
Latin in Western Europe
Greek in the Byzantine Empire
Middle Persian literature of the late Sassanid period
Tiberian Hebrew as written by the Masoretes
Classical Arabic in the Islamic Caliphate
Classical Armenian literature of Medieval Armenia
Old Georgian literature
Old Turkic manuscript tradition, from the 8th century
early Japanese literature, from the 8th century (Nara period)
early Ge'ez literature
early Dravidian (Kannada, Tamil, etc.) literature in South India
early Celtic manuscript traditions (Old Irish, Old Welsh)
early Germanic (Old High German, Old English, Old Saxon, Old Norse) literature, from the 8th century
Old Church Slavonic, from the 9th century

Undated
The bulk of literature in Classical Sanskrit dates to the Early Medieval period, but in most cases cannot be dated to a specific century.

The vocalized Masoretic Text of the Hebrew Bible developed during the 7th to 10th centuries.

The Old English Beowulf is dated to anywhere between the 8th and early 11th centuries.

Ecgbert, Archbishop of York c.732–766, establishes a notable library in the Northumbrian city of York.

6th century
Arabic literature
Antarah ibn Shaddad
Aramaic literature (Jewish Babylonian Aramaic)
Babylonian Talmud
Indian Literature 
Sanskrit literature
Aryabhata:Aryabhatiya
Yativṛṣabha:Tiloyapannatti
Varāhamihira:Pancha-Siddhantika, Brihat-Samhita
Virahanka
Jatasimhanandi: Varangacharita.
Dharmakirti:Saṃbandhaparikṣhāvrtti, Pramāṇaviniścaya, Pramāṇavārttikakārika, PramāṇavārttikasvavrttiNyāyabinduprakaraṇa, Hetubindunāmaprakaraṇa, Saṃtānāntarasiddhināmaprakaraṇa, Vādanyāyanāmaprakaraṇa
Bhāviveka:Madhyamakahṛdaya-karika, Prajñāpradīpa,Wisdom Lamp (Prajñāpradīpa)
Śīlabhadra:Buddhabhūmivyākhyāna
Udyotakara:Nyāyavārttika
Prashastapada:Padārtha-dharma-saṅgraha, Praśastapāda Bhāṣya
Vishakhadatta:Mudrārākṣasa, Devichandraguptam
Bhatta Narayana:Venisamhara
Sthiramati :Ratnagotravibhāga 
Dignāga: Pramāṇa-samuccaya, Hetucakra, Alambana-parīkṣā, Abhidharmakośa-marma-pradīpa, Trikāla-parikṣa, Nyāya-mukha 
Gaudapada:Māṇḍukya Kārikā, Durga Saptashati Tika, Uttara Gita Bhashya, Subhagodaya,Sri Vidyaratna Sutra bhasya
Buddhapālita:Buddhapalitavrtti
Byzantine literature
PG 86a: Presbyter Timothy of Constantinople, Joannes Maxentius, Theodorus Lector, Procopius Deacon of Tyre, Theodorus Bishop of Scythopolis, Presbyter Timothy of Jerusalem, Theodosius I of Alexandria, Eusebius of Alexandria, Eusebius of Emesa, Gregentius of Taphar, Patriarch Epiphanius of Constantinople, Isaac of Nineveh, Barsanuphius of Palestine, Eustathius monk, Emperor Justinian, Agapetus the Deacon, Leontius Byzantinus
PG 86b: Leontius Byzantinus (continuation), Patriarch Ephraim of Antioch, Paulus Silentiarius, Patriarch Eutychius of Constantinople, Evagrius Scholasticus, Eulogius of Alexandria, Simeon Stylites the Younger, Patriarch Zacharias of Jerusalem, Patriarch Modestus of Jerusalem, Anonymous on the siege of Jerusalem by the Persians, Jobius, Erechthius Bishop of Antioch in Pisidia, Peter Bishop of Laodicea.
Secret History by Procopius
Chinese literature (Early Middle Chinese)
Emperor Jianwen of Liang
Thousand Character Classic
Latin literature (see Late Latin)
Chronicle of Fredegar
Commentary on Job by Pope Gregory I
Etymologiae by Isidore of Seville
Historia Francorum by Gregory of Tours
The Origin and Deeds of the Goths by Jordanes
Patrologia Latina vols 63-80: Boetius, Ennodius Felix, Trifolius presbyter, Hormisdas I, Elpis, Boetius, Fulgentius Ruspensis, Felix IV, Bonifacius II, Benedictus pater monachorum Occidentalium, Dionysius Exiguus, Viventiolus Lugdunensis, Trojanus Santonensis, Pontianus Africae, Caesarius Arelatensis, Fulgentius Ferrandus, Primasius Adrumetanus, Arator, Nicetius Trevirensis, Aurelianus Arelatensis, Cassiodorus, Gregorius Turonensis, Pelagius II, Joannes II, Benedictus I, Gregorius I, Eutropius Episcopus, Gregorius I, Paterius (Notarius Gregorii I), Alulfus Tornacensis, Maximus Caesaraugustanus Episcopus, Eutropius Episcopus, Tarra Monachus, Dinothus Abbas, Dynamus Patricius, Augustinus Apostolus Anglorum, SS Bonifacius IV, Concilium Romanum III, Bulgaranus, Paulus Emeritanus Diaconus, Tamaius De Vargas. Thomas, Gondemarus Rex Gothorum, Marcus Cassinensis, Warnaharius Lingonensis Episcopus, Columbanus Hibernus
Agathias
Evagrius Scholasticus
Pahlavi literature
Borzūya

7th century
Arabic language
Qur'an
Indian Literature
Sanskrit literature:
Bhagavadajjukam (satirical play)
Brahmagupta: Brāhmasphuṭasiddhānta, Khandakhadyaka, Grahaṇārkajñāna
Kumārila Bhaṭṭa: Shlokavartika, Tantravartika, Tuptika
Chandragomin: Shisyalekha, Twenty Verses on the Bodhisattva Vow, Sarvatathāgataoṣṇīṣaśitātapatrā-nāmāparājitā-mahāpratyangirā-mahāvidyārājñī-nāma-dhāraṇi
Bhāskara I: Āryabhaṭīyabhāṣya, Mahābhāskarīya, Laghubhāskarīya
Bhutabali: Satkhandagama
Madhava-kara: Rug-vinischaya
Amaru: Amaru Shataka
Mahendravarman I: Mattavilasa Prahasana (satire), Bhagavadajjukam
Haribhadra: Anekāntajayapatākā, Yogadṛṣṭisamuccaya, Ashtakaprakarana, Dharmabindu, Dhūrtākhyāna, Pañcāśaka, Ṣaḍdarśanasamuccaya, Samarāiccakahā, Sāstravārtāsamuccaya, Yogabindu, Yogaśataka, Sanmatti Prakaran
Budhasvamin: Bṛhatkathāślokasaṃgraha
Bāṇabhaṭṭa: Harshacharita, Kadambari
Daṇḍin: Kavyadarsha, Daśakumāracarita
Bhamaha: Kâvyâlankâra
Subandhu
Mayurbhatta: Surya Satakam
Ravisena: Padma Purana
Manatunga: Bhaktamara Stotra
Haridatta: Grahacaranibandhana
Prakrit Literature
Jinabhadra: Brihatsangrahani, Briharkshetrasamasa, Visheshanavati, Visheshavashyaka Bhashya, Dhyanashataka, Jitkalpa Sutra
Byzantine literature
PG 87a-87b: Procopius of Gaza
PG 87c: Procopius of Gaza, Joannes Moschus, Sophronius, Alexander monk
PG 88: Cosmas Indicopleustes, Constantine the Deacon, Joannes Climacus, Agathias Myrinæ, Gregory Bishop of Antioch, Joannes Jejunator (Patriarch John IV of Constantinople), Dorotheus the Archimandrite
PG 89: Anastasius Sinaita, Anastasius of Antioch, Anastasius Abbot of Euthymius, Anastasius IV Patriarch of Antioch, Antiochus of Sabe
PG 90: Maximus the Abbot
PG 91: Maximus the Confessor, Thalassius the Abbot, Theodore of Raithu
PG 92: Paschal Chronicle, George Pisides
PG 93: Olympiodorus Deacon of Alexandria, Hesychius, Leontius Bishop of Neapolis in Cyprus, Leontius of Damascus
Latin literature
Chronicon Paschale
Origo Gentis Langobardorum
Patrologia Latina vols. 80-89: Aileranus Scoto Hibernus, Ethelbertus Anglorum, SS Adeodatus I, Sisebutus Gothorum, Bertichramnus Cenomanensis, Protandius Vesuntinus Archiepiscopus, SS Bonifacius V, Sonniatus Rhemensis Archiepiscopus, Verus Ruthenensis Episcopus, Chlotarius II Francorum Rex, SS Honorius I, Dagobertus Francorum Rex, Hadoinudus Cenomanensis Episcopus, Sulpicius Bituricensis Episcopus, Autbertus Cameracensis, SS Ioannes IV, Eutrandus Ticinensis Diaconus, Victor Carthaginensis Episcopus, Braulio Caesaraugustiani, Taio Caesaraugustianus Episcopus, Isidorus Hispalensis, Liturgia Mozarabica, Venantius Fortunatus, Crisconius Africanus, Sergius I, Joannes VI, Felix Ravennatensis, Bonifacius Moguntinus
Hiberno-Latin
Hisperica Famina
 Old English literature
Cædmon: Cædmon's Hymn
 Middle Chinese (see Tang dynasty Chinese writers)
 Bianji (辯機)
 Li Dashi (李大師, 570–628)
 Yan Shigu (顏師古, 581–645)
 Chu Suiliang (褚遂良, 597–658)
 Fang Xuanling (Fang Qiao, 房喬 579–648)
 Li Qiao (李嶠, 644–713)
 Li Jing (李靖, 571–649)
 Li Baiyao (李百藥, 564–647)
 Li Chunfeng (李淳風, 602–670)
 Liu Zhiji (劉知幾, 661–721)
 Luo Binwang (駱賓王, c. 640–684)
 Ouyang Xun (歐陽詢, 557–641)
 Sun Simiao (孫思邈, 581–682)
 Yu Shinan (虞世南, 558–638)
 Wei Zheng (魏徵, 580–643)
 Sun Guoting (孫過庭, 646–691)
Armenian
Sebeos
John Mamikonean
Anania Shirakatsi
Ge'ez
Garima Gospels

8th century
Indian Literature 
Sanskrit literature
Gautama Siddha :Treatise on Astrology of the Kaiyuan Era
Prajñāvarman:Devātiśāyastotraṭīkā, Udānavargavivara, Viśeṣastavaṭikā
Shivamara II:Gajamathakalpana
Bhavabhuti:Mahaviracharita,Malatimadhava, Uttararamacarita
Vilwamangalam Swamiyar:Shree Krishna Karnamrutam, Sreechinham,Purushakaaram,Abhinava-Kausthubha-Maala, Dakshinaamoorthy-Sthavam,Kaalavadha Kaavyam,Durgaasthuthi,Baalakrishna Sthothram,Baalagopaala Sthuthy,Sreekrishna Varadaashtakam,Vrindaavana Sthothram,Bhaavanaamukuram,Raamachandraashtakam,Ganapathy Sthothram,Anubhavaashtakam,Mahaakaalaashtakam,Kaarkotakaashtakam,Krishnaleelaa-Vinodam,Sankara-Hridayamgamaa,Subanda-Saamraajyam,Thinganda-Saamraajyam,Kramadeepika
 Akalanka:Laghiyastraya,Pramānasangraha,Nyāyaviniscaya-vivarana,Siddhiviniscaya-vivarana,Astasati,Tattvārtharājavārtika
Dharmottara:Nyāyabinduṭīkā
Lalla:Jyotiṣaratnakośa, Śiṣyadhīvṛddhidatantra
Acharya Vamana:Kavyalankara Sutra 
Kamalaśīla: Bhāvanākrama, Madhyamālaṃkāra-panjika
Padmapadacharya:Pañcapādikā.
Śālikanātha: Prakaraṇapañcikā,Rjuvimalāpañcikā ,Dīpaśikhāpañcikā
Śāntarakṣita:Tattvasaṅgraha, Tattvasaṅgraha
Shantideva:Śikṣāsamuccaya, Bodhicaryavatara
Virūpa: Amṛtasiddhi
Adi Shankara:Commentaries on -, Aitareya Upaniṣad, Bṛhadāraṇyaka Upaniṣad, Īśa Upaniṣad, Taittirīya Upaniṣad, Śvetāśvatara Upaniṣad, Kaṭha Upaniṣad, Kena Upaniṣad, Chāndogya Upaniṣad, Māṇḍūkya Upaniṣad, Muṇḍaka Upaniṣad, Praśna Upaniṣad, BhagavadgītaVishnu Sahasranama, Sānatsujātiya, Gāyatri Mantraṃ     Philosophical works-Vivekacūḍāmaṇi, Upadeśasāhasri, Pañcīkaraṇa, Ātma bodha, Aparokṣānubhūti, Nirvāṇa Ṣaṭkam, Manīśa Pañcakaṃ  Vākya vṛtti
Vidyananda:Ashtasahasri 
Vimalamitra:Vima Nyingthig.
Sridhara::Trisatika, Pāṭīgaṇita 
Byzantine literature
PG 94–95: John of Damascus
PG 96: John of Damascus, John of Nicæa, Patriarch John VI of Constantinople, Joannes of Eubœa
PG 97: John Malalas (6th century), Andrew of Crete, Elias of Crete and Theodore Abucara
PG 98: Patriarch Germanus I of Constantinople, Cosmas of Jerusalem, Gregory of Agrigento, Anonymus Becuccianus, Pantaleon Deacon of Constantinople, Adrian monk, Epiphanius Deacon of Catania, Pachomius monk, Philotheus monk, Patriarch Tarasios of Constantinople
PG 99: Theodore of Studion
Latin literature
Bede (Patrologia Latina vols. 90–95), Historia ecclesiastica gentis Anglorum etc.
Anonymous, Vita Sancti Cuthberti
Stephen of Ripon, Vita Sancti Wilfrithi
Paulus Diaconus, Historia Langobardorum
John of Damascus
Patrologia Latina vols. 96-101   Hildefonsus Toletanus, Julianus Toletanus, Leo II, Carolus Magnus, Ludovicus I, Lotharius, Rudolphus I, Paulinus Aquileiensis, Theodorus Cantuariensis, Alcuinus
Navigatio sancti Brendani abbatis (Voyage of St Brendan the abbot)
'Codex Amiatinus', earliest surviving complete manuscript of the Vulgate, produced at Monkwearmouth–Jarrow Abbey and gifted in 716 to the Pope
Celtic literature
Immram Brain (maic Febail) (The Voyage of Bran [son of Febail])
Immram Maele Dúin (The Voyage of Máel Dúin)
Arabic literature
Ibn Ishaq
Khalil ibn Ahmad
Wahb ibn Munabbih
Ibn al-Muqaffa'
 Middle Chinese (see Tang dynasty Chinese writers)
 Du Huan (杜環, fl. 8th century)
 Du You (杜佑, 735–812)
 Li Bai (李白, 701–762)
 Liu Zhi (劉秩, fl. 8th century)
 Lu Yu (陸羽, 733–804), The Classic of Tea (茶經, chájīng, c. 760–62)
 Qian Qi (錢起, 710–782)
 Sima Zhen (司馬貞, fl. 8th century)
 Wang Wei (王維, 699–759)
 Yi Xing (一行, 683–727)
 Japanese literature
Man'yōshū (万葉集) compiled by Ōtomo no Yakamochi (大伴 家持)
Kannada: see Rashtrakuta literature
Old Georgian: The Life of Saint Nino, The Martyrdom of Abo Tbileli

9th century
Byzantine literature
PG 100: Patriarch Nikephoros I of Constantinople, Stephen Deacon of Constantinople, Gregory of Decapolis, Patriarch Christopher I of Alexandria, Patriarch Methodios I of Constantinople
PG 101–103: Photius of Constantinople
PG 104: Photius of Constantinople, Petrus Siculus, Peter bishop of Argos (Saint Peter the Wonderworker), Bartholomew of Edessa
PG 105: Nicetas of Paphlagonia, Nicetas Byzantius, Theognostus monk, Anonymous, Joseph the Hymnographer
Latin literature
Carolingian minuscule calligraphy begins to be developed; Martianus Hiberniensis (819–75) is among the pioneers
Stuttgart Psalter (c. 820), Golden Psalter of St. Gallen
Annales Bertiniani (830–882), Abbey of Saint Bertin, Saint-Omer, France
According to history-book of Tāriḵ-e Sistān (History of Sistan), the first Persian qasida is written by Moḥammad bin Wasif in praise of Ya'qub ibn al-Layth al-Saffar in c. 872.
De bellis Parisiacae urbis (The Wars of the City of Paris), in Latin, by Abbo Cernuus (890s)
Liber Pontificalis
Patrologia Latina vols. 102–132: Smaragdus S. Michaelis, Benedictus Anianensis, Sedulius Scotus, Agobardus Lugdunensis, Eginhardus, Claudius Taurinensis, Ludovicus Pius, Theodulfus Aurelianensis, Eigil Fuldensis, Dungalus reclusus, Ermoldus Nigellus, Symphosius Amalarius, Gregorius IV, Sergius II, Jonas Aurelianensis, Freculphus Lexoviensis, Frotharius Tullensis, Rabanus Maurus, Walafridus Strabo, the Glossa Ordinaria, Leo IV, Benedictus III, Eulogius Toletanus, Prudentius Trecensis, Angelomus Lexoviensis, Haymo Halberstatensis, Nicolaus I, Florus Lugdunensis, Lupus Ferrariensis, Paschasius Radbertus, Ratramnus Corbeiensis, Aeneas Parisiensis, Remigius Lugdunensis, Wandalbertus Prumiensis, Paulus Alvarus Cordubensis, Gotteschalcus Orbacensis, Johannes Scotus Eriugena, Ado Viennensis, Usuardus Sangermanii, Carolus II Calvus, Hincmarus Rhemensis, Anastasius bibliothecarius, Isidorus Mercator, Remigius Antissiodorensis, Notkerus Balbulus, Regino Prumiensis, Hucbaldus S. Amandi
Vita Brendani / Betha Brenainn / Life of St. Brendan
Nennius (attributed), Historia Brittonum (The History of the Britons, c. 828–29)
Asser, Vita Ælfredi regis Angul Saxonum (The Life of King Alfred, 893)
Book of Kells written and illuminated in a Columban monastery in the British Isles (c. 800)
Old English literature (890s)
Alfred the Great's translations 
Pope Gregory I's Pastoral Care, the first known book in English
Boethius' The Consolation of Philosophy and an alliterative verse version, the Metres of Boethius
Blostman ("Blooms"), an anthology partly based on the Soliloquies of Augustine
Portions of the Vulgate Book of Exodus and the first fifty poems of the Psalter
Werferth's translation of Pope Gregory I's Dialogues
Translation of Orosius' Histories against the Pagans incorporating the narrative of Ohthere of Hålogaland
Translation of Bede's Historia ecclesiastica gentis Anglorum (Ecclesiastical History of the English People)
Arabic literature
Al-Kitāb al-muḫtaṣar fī ḥisāb al-ğabr wa-l-muqābala (The Compendious Book on Calculation by Completion and Balancing)
Persian scholar Sibawayh writes the first Arabic grammar in 840.
Al-Baladhuri (died892)
Al-Jahiz (776–868/9)
Kitab al-Hayawan (Book of Animals)
Kitab al-Bukhala (Book of Misers)
Kitab al-Bayan wa al-Tabyin (Book of Eloquence and Demonstration)
Risalat mufakharat al-sudan 'ala al-bidan (Treatise on Blacks)
Ibn Sa'd (784–845) – Kitab Tabaqat Al-Kubra (Book of the Major Classes, biographical collection) 
Abdallah ibn al-Mu'tazz (861–908)
Al-Waqidi (c. 748–822)
Ya'qubi (died 897/8)
The Book of One Thousand and One Nights, presumed to originate in this century (the oldest surviving text belongs to the 14th century)
Germanic
Þjóðólfr of Hvinir
Haustlöng
Ynglingatal
Þorbjörn Hornklofi
Glymdrápa
Hrafnsmál (Haraldskvæði)
Sanskrit literature
Gunavarma I
Amoghavarsha I
868: May 11 – The Diamond Sutra, the oldest known surviving dated book, is printed in China.
Middle Chinese (see Tang dynasty Chinese writers)
Duan Chengshi (段成式, died863)
Han Yu (韓愈, 768–824)
Mo Xuanqing (莫宣卿, died 834)
Li Ao (李翱, 772–841)
Liu Yuxi (劉禹錫, 772–842)
Liu Zongyuan (柳宗元, 773–819)
Yuan Zhen (元稹, 779–831)
Zhang Yanyuan (張彥遠)
Tamil: see Chola literature
Kannada: see Rashtrakuta literature
Kavirajamarga, Royal path to poets in Kannada
Vaddaradhane
Govindsvamin
Shivakotiacharya
Armenian
Tovma Artsruni
Old Church Slavonic
Turkic
Book of Dede Korkut

See also
 Ancient literature
 List of years in literature
10th century in literature
Byzantine literature
Kannada literature
Medieval Bulgarian literature
Puranas

Notes

References
 
 

 
 
02